Saint-Pierre is a commune in the Bas-Rhin department, Alsace, north-eastern France.

See also
 Communes of the Bas-Rhin department

References

Communes of Bas-Rhin